Nature Reviews Neurology is a monthly peer-reviewed scientific journal published by Nature Portfolio. It was established in 2005 as Nature Clinical Practice Neurology, but was renamed in April 2009. It covers research developments and clinical practice in neurology. Coverage includes prevention, diagnosis and treatment of disease or impaired function of the central and peripheral nervous systems, including neurodevelopmental, neurodegenerative, and neuropsychiatric disorders. The editor-in-chief is Heather Wood.

According to the Journal Citation Reports, the journal has a 2021 impact factor of 44.711, ranking it 2nd out of 212 journals in the category "Clinical Neurology".

References

External links
 Official website

Nature Research academic journals
Neurology journals
English-language journals
Monthly journals
Publications established in 2005
Review journals